The Canon de 130 mm Modèle 1919 was a medium-caliber naval guns used as the primary armament on a number of French Destroyers during World War II.

Description
The Canon de 130 mm Modèle 1919 was of built up construction with a Welin breech block.  These guns were carried in low-angle single turrets on Destroyers.

Ammunition 
Ammunition was of Separate loading QF ammunition type.

The gun was able to fire: 
 Semi Armour-Piercing - 
 High Explosive - 
 Illumination - Unknown

Naval Service

Ship classes that carried the Canon de 130 mm Modèle 1919 include:
 Bourrasque-class destroyers
 Chacal-class destroyers

Notes

References

External links 
 http://www.navweaps.com/Weapons/WNFR_51-40_m1919.php

Naval guns of France
130 mm artillery